Romanian Social Democratic Party may refer to:
 Social Democratic Party (Romania), a current Romanian party.
 Romanian Social Democratic Party (1990–2001), a former Romanian political party, that formed the Social Democratic Party by fusing with the Party of Social Democracy in Romania in January 2001.
 Romanian Social Democratic Party (1927–48)
 Social Democratic Party of Romania (1910–18)